Estadio El Ejido was a multi-use stadium in Quito, Ecuador that was primarily used for football matches. It served as the home ground for all the Quito-based, including Aucas, Deportivo Quito, and LDU Quito. It had a capacity for 20,000. Estadio Olímpico Atahualpa replaced it as the premier football stadium in the city in 1962. The stadium closed in 1965 and was subsequently demolished in 1966. Parque El Arbolito, located at Avenida 6 de Diciembre and Tarqui, is the location of where the stadium used to stand.

External links
Stadium history on Deportivo Quito's website 

L.D.U. Quito
Football venues in Quito
Defunct football venues in Ecuador
Sports venues completed in 1932
Sports venues demolished in 1966
Multi-purpose stadiums in Ecuador